Pelmatellini is a tribe of ground beetles in the family Carabidae. There are about 8 genera and at least 90 described species in Pelmatellini.

Genera
These eight genera belong to the tribe Pelmatellini:
 Hakaharpalus Larochelle & Larivière, 2005
 Kupeharpalus Larochelle & Larivière, 2005
 Lecanomerus Chaudoir, 1850
 Nemaglossa Solier, 1849
 Notospeophonus B.Moore, 1962
 Pelmatellus Bates, 1882
 Syllectus Bates, 1878
 Trachysarus Reed, 1874

References

Harpalinae